Posterior branch may refer to:

 Posterior branch of obturator nerve
 Posterior branches of sacral nerves
 Posterior branches of the lumbar nerves
 Posterior branch of coccygeal nerve
 Posterior branches of thoracic nerves
 Posterior branches of cervical nerves
 Posterior gastric branches of posterior vagal trunk
 Posterior ramus of spinal nerve
 Posterior septal branches of sphenopalatine artery